Hugh Northcote (1 November 1868 – 12 August 1933) was an Anglican clergyman in New Zealand and writer on sex.

Hugh Northcote was the son of Henry Moubray Northcote and Elinor Mallet. He was born in Devonshire, but the family emigrated to Canterbury, New Zealand. After graduating with a first in classics from Canterbury University College, he became an Anglican priest. In 1903 he and his family left for England, where he lived until 1927, when he returned to New Zealand.

Northcote corresponded with Havelock Ellis, and helped to popularise the term 'inversion' for homosexuality.

Works
 Ancient and modern changes in women's social position, Christchurch, N.Z.: [H. Northcote], 1896.
 Christianity and sex problems, Philadelphia: Davis, 1906. 2nd ed., 1916.
 Edith Cavell's last thought and other poems, London: Kegan Paul, Trench, Trubner, 1918.
 The social value of the study of sex psychology, London: British Society for the Study of Sex Psychology, 1920.

References

External link

1868 births
1933 deaths
New Zealand Anglican priests
New Zealand sexologists